Cutting Hall Performing Arts Center is a theater in Palatine, Illinois, which was once the auditorium to Palatine High School. It was built in 1927 in honor of Mr. Charles S. Cutting, the principal of Palatine High School. The remainder of the original school building  no longer stands. Three separate building additions were added. After the school district opened the Current high school In 1977, a referendum was passed, and the Community Center and Village Hall now occupy these facilities. This beautiful theater has been renovated and seats 430. The main lobby was added in 1978. The box office and entries were the original front entrance to the building.

Cutting Hall is home to recitals, plays, musicals, and movies. Cutting Hall is a facility maintained by the Palatine Park District.  The theatre space is utilized by numerous amateur theatrical groups, including Music On Stage, Theatre Nebula, Up and Coming Theater, Lake Zurich Players, Wood Street Theater, Cricket Theatre Company, and  The Palatine Players.

External links
  Park District Cutting Hall page

Theatres in Illinois
Buildings and structures in Cook County, Illinois
Tourist attractions in Cook County, Illinois
Palatine, Illinois